Charles Marie Imbault (19 February 1909 – 11 February 1996) was a French field hockey player who competed in the 1936 Summer Olympics.

He is the twin brother of Paul Imbault.

He was a member of the French field hockey team, which finished fourth in the 1936 Olympic tournament. He played one match as forward.

References

External links
 
part 6 the field hockey tournament
Charles Imbault's profile at Sport Reference.com

1909 births
1996 deaths
French male field hockey players
Olympic field hockey players of France
Field hockey players at the 1936 Summer Olympics
French twins
Twin sportspeople
20th-century French people